Rookwith is a hamlet and civil parish in the Hambleton district of North Yorkshire, England, about  west of Bedale and near the flow of the River Ure. The hamlet was mentioned in the Domesday Book as belonging to Count Alan and having four ploughlands.

The population at the 2011 Census was less than 100. Details are included in the civil parish of Thirn. The population in 2015 was estimated to be 20.

References

External links

Villages in North Yorkshire
Civil parishes in North Yorkshire